The Silvertown Tunnel is a road tunnel under construction beneath the River Thames between the Greenwich Peninsula and west Silvertown.

It is being promoted by Transport for London and will be delivered through a design, build, finance and maintain contract by the Riverlinx consortium. The tunnel is intended to reduce congestion through the Blackwall Tunnel and both tunnels will be tolled when it opens in 2025. The contract for construction was awarded in November 2019.

The tunnel will include dedicated lanes for heavy goods vehicles and buses, but it will not be accessible to walkers or cyclists. All future bus routes that will use the tunnel will be zero emission.

Route
The design is for a twin-bore tunnel to connect the A1020 Silvertown Way/Lower Lea Crossing on the north side with the A102 road Blackwall Tunnel Approach on the south side, on an alignment similar to the Emirates Air Line cable car. Lane 1 will be dedicated to buses and goods vehicles over 7.5t, while lane 2 will be available for all traffic. The proposed tunnel would affect access to Thames Wharf station proposed as part of the Docklands Light Railway's London City Airport extension.

Cost
In 2012, the cost was stated to be £600m. A consultation in 2015 stated that the cost of construction was estimated to be £1bn. In March 2020, the cost was increased again, to £1.2 billion. Operation and maintenance of the tunnel over 25 years is expected to cost another £1bn.

Opposition
The tunnel has been criticised by opponents who fear it will increase levels of traffic, in turn increasing air pollution. Green Party member and councillor Caroline Russell expressed concern that as the cost of the tunnel would be covered by tolling, future mayors of London will want to keep traffic levels high in order to pay this off. The lack of walking or cycling facilities in the tunnel has been criticised. A planned pedestrian and cyclist bridge from Rotherhithe to Canary Wharf, the Rotherhithe crossing, was cancelled in 2019.

Plans submitted in 2019 suggested 19 trees would be removed. However, revised plans submitted in 2021 suggested over 100 trees would be removed to construct the tunnel and access roads.

Political opposition
Green Party: 
Cllr Scott Ainslie, former Green MEP for London and councillor on Lambeth Council.
Jonathan Bartley, former Co-leader of the Green Party and Leader of the Opposition on Lambeth Council.
Cllr Siân Berry, Green Party member of the London Assembly and Leader of the Green Group on Camden Council.
Cllr Caroline Russell, Green Party member on the London Assembly and Leader of the Opposition on Islington Council.
Zack Polanski, Green Party member of the London Assembly.

Conservative Party:

Andrew Boff, former Conservative Group leader and Chairman of the London Assembly.
Zac Goldsmith, former Conservative MP for Richmond Park and North Kingston, candidate for Mayor of London and Member of the House of Lords.

Liberal Democrats: 
Siobhan Benita, former Liberal Democrat candidate for Mayor of London
Sir Edward Davey, Leader of the Liberal Democrats and former Secretary of State for Energy and Climate Change.
Cllr Luisa Porritt, Liberal Democrat candidate for Mayor of London and Councillor in Camden.
Caroline Pigeon, Liberal Democrat leader on the London Assembly.
Munira Wilson, Liberal Democrat MP for Twickenham.

Labour Party:
Lyn Brown, Labour MP for West Ham.
Cllr Damien Egan, Labour Mayor of Lewisham.
Rokhsana Fiaz, Labour Mayor of Newham.
Philip Glanville, Labour Mayor of Hackney.
Abena Oppong-Asare, MP for Erith and Thamesmead.
Cllr Peter John, Labour leader of Southwark Council.
Matthew Pennycook, Labour MP for Greenwich and Woolwich.
John McDonnell, Labour MP for Hayes and Harlington.

Campaign groups
The tunnel is opposed by the 'No to the Silvertown Tunnel' campaign, and more recently the Stop the Silvertown Tunnel Coalition which claims that it would generate more traffic and more congestion, and lead to more air pollution.

Friends of the Earth have been lobbying Tower Hamlets Borough Council to reject the proposal.

In July 2020, Extinction Rebellion protesters locked themselves to a drilling rig, calling on Mayor of London Sadiq Khan to halt the project amidst environmental concerns. In April 2021, 52 academics and campaigners sent a joint open letter to transport secretary Grant Shapps and Mayor of London Sadiq Khan seeking an "emergency review" of the proposed tunnel's environmental impact.

History
It was proposed that the project should be reviewed in 2006 following the completion of the Thames Gateway Bridge. The then London Mayor, Ken Livingstone, supported the scheme in principle and expressed a preference that the link be a road tunnel. The Mayor's Transport Strategy stated that construction of the link would follow the implementation of the subsequently cancelled Thames Gateway Bridge.

A public consultation on the Silvertown Tunnel and the Gallions Reach Ferry took place between February and March 2012. A further consultation was conducted from 29 October 2012 to 1 February 2013.

A consultation on tolling both the Silvertown and the Blackwall tunnels opened in October 2014. Following a Nationally Significant Infrastructure Project inquiry, the government approved the proposal in May 2018, and the contract was awarded in November 2019 to the Riverlinx consortium.

Construction began in March 2021. The southbound tunnel drive was completed in January 2023, and overall construction is due for completion in 2025.

Public transport 
When Transport for London applied for permission to build the tunnel, it proposed that five bus routes would use it. However, in October 2022 plans for bus routes were revealed with only two routes using the tunnel.

Traffic modelling in 2016 was based on around 37 buses using the tunnels but this was later reduced to 20 buses during peak times.

See also
Thames Gateway Bridge, a bridge proposal that was cancelled in 2008
Lower Thames Crossing, a proposed crossing to the east of the M25
Gallions Reach Crossing, a proposed tunnel or bridge between Beckton and Thamesmead
Belvedere Crossing, a proposed tunnel or bridge between Belvedere and Rainham
List of crossings of the River Thames
List of road projects in the UK

References

External links

Silvertown Tunnel TfL project page
'No to Silvertown Tunnel' campaign 
Stop the Silvertown Tunnel Coalition

Transport in the Royal Borough of Greenwich
Transport in the London Borough of Newham
Proposed tunnels in the United Kingdom
Proposed road tunnels in Europe
Proposed roads in the United Kingdom
Nationally Significant Infrastructure Projects (United Kingdom)